Fluentify is an online language tutoring website. Founded in 2013 and headquartered in London, United Kingdom, the company is privately owned and operated by Fluentify LTD. The platform offers online language classes with selected native speakers.

History 
Fluentify was founded in February 2013 and launched into public beta in May 2013. The same month, the company was selected to join London-based Accelerator Academy for three months of training. In March 2014, Fluentify announced that it had raised $410k in angel funding from the banker Stefano Marsaglia. Marsaglia is a prominent M&A banker, currently the co-head of corporate and investment banking at Mediobanca, Italy’s biggest publicly traded investment bank.

Fluentify and the founders have received the attention of the media in Italy. In April 2014, the two founders of the company were invited to be a guest on the TV show Che Tempo Che FA, one of the most famous programs in Italy organized by Fabio Fazio.

In May 2014, Wired Monthly Technology Magazine chose Fluentify as one of the top 6 tools to learn online foreign languages.

Business model
Fluentify scales by increasing the number of students and tutors and matching them with each other. The company claims that top tutors can earn up to £2,500 per month.

References

External links 
 Fluentify Official Site
 Company blog

Language education in the United Kingdom
Privately held companies of the United Kingdom
Online companies of the United Kingdom
Education companies of the United Kingdom
Companies based in London
Social networking language-learning websites
British educational websites